The 1946 Mississippi State Maroons football team was an American football team that represented Mississippi State College in the Southeastern Conference during the 1946 college football season. In their seventh season under head coach Allyn McKeen, the Maroons compiled an 8–2 record (3–2 against SEC opponents) and outscored all opponents by a total of 271 to 71.

Five Mississippi State players received honors from the Associated Press or United Press on the 1946 All-SEC football team: halfback Shorty McWilliams (AP-1, UP_3); tackle Al Sidorik (UP-1) end Bill Hildebrand (UP-2); center Elbert Corley (UP-3); and guard Mike Mihalic (UP-3).

Schedule

After the season

The 1947 NFL Draft was held on December 16, 1946. The following Maroon was selected.

References

Mississippi State
Mississippi State Bulldogs football seasons
Mississippi State Maroons football